Neodymium bismuthide or Bismuth-Neodymium is a binary inorganic compound of neodymium and bismuth with the formula NdBi. It forms crystals.

Preparation 
Neodymium bismuthide can be prepared by reacting a stoichiometric amount of neodymium and bismuth at 1900°C:

Nd + Bi → NdBi

Physical properties 
Neodymium bismuthide forms cubic crystals of the space group Fm3m, with cell parameters a = 0.64222 nm, Z = 4 with a structure like sodium chloride. The compound melts at 1900°C. At a temperature of 24 K, an antiferromagnetic transition occurs in the compound.

References 

Neodymium compounds
Bismuth compounds
Bismuthides